Ohn Gyaw (born 3 March 1932) is a Burmese politician who served as 16th Minister of Foreign Affairs. Ohn Gyaw joined the diplomatic service in 1951, serving in Yugoslavia, Australia, and the USSR until 1985, when he was appointed Director of the South and Southeast Asian Division of the Ministry of Foreign Affairs. In 1988 he became Deputy Minister of Foreign Affairs, and in 1991 was promoted to Minister of Foreign Affairs. In 1998 he was replaced; despite a thawing of relationships between Burma and the outside world during his tenure as Foreign Minister, Ohn Gyaw was seen as a "rigid and, at times, disingenuous champion of the regime" who "lacked innovation". He was replaced by Win Aung. He was in office when Burma won the observer position of ASEAN in July 1996 and full membership in July 1997. He played a key role in Burma becoming a member country and taking the chairmanship of it in 2014.

References

1932 births
Living people
Foreign ministers of Myanmar
Government ministers of Myanmar
Ambassadors of Myanmar to Yugoslavia
Ambassadors of Myanmar to Australia
Ambassadors of Myanmar to the Soviet Union